KVUI (channel 31) is a television station licensed to Pocatello, Idaho, United States, serving the Idaho Falls–Pocatello market as an affiliate of Ion Television. It is owned by Ventura Broadcasting alongside Grit affiliate KPIF (channel 15, also licensed to Pocatello). The two stations share studios on West Alameda Road in Pocatello; KVUI's transmitter is located on Howard Mountain.

History

Channel 31 signed on the air as KFXP, the Fox affiliate for the Pocatello–Idaho Falls market, on July 16, 1998. Prior to the station's launch, Fox programming had been seen on area cable systems via Foxnet; the network also maintained a secondary affiliation with CBS affiliate KIDK (channel 3). KFXP was originally owned by a partnership of three companies—Redwood Broadcasting, Winstar Communications, and Compass Communications—that had competed for the license; through a time brokerage agreement, the station was operated by Sunbelt Communications (later known as Intermountain West Communications Company), owner of NBC outlet KPVI (channel 6), and the two stations shared studios in Pocatello. By 1999, Compass Communications had acquired Redwood and Winstar's interests in KFXP. In its early years, channel 31 had a secondary affiliation with UPN; however, this had ended by 2000.

KFXP discontinued its Fox affiliation on July 1, 2012 following a dispute with the network over retransmission consent; several other stations lost their Fox affiliations a year earlier for similar reasons. The station subsequently affiliated with This TV (previously shown on KPVI-DT3) effective on that date with the network airing during the morning and overnight hours, though it retained general entertainment programming during daytime and prime time hours. Twin Falls sister station KXTF also lost its affiliation and switched to This TV on the same date, with Fox programming moving to MyNetworkTV affiliate KTWT-LD as a primary affiliation. MyNetworkTV affiliate KXPI-LD (channel 34, which is repeated on KIDK-DT2) assumed the Fox affiliation and retained MyNetworkTV as a secondary affiliation.

KFXP went dark on July 1, 2013 following the end of its lease on its transmission tower; a new lease on the tower cannot be negotiated until the completion of an ownership change for the tower. The time brokerage agreement with KPVI-DT was also terminated as of the preceding day; it had been slated to expire on July 16. KFXP had begun showing a still announcing the shutdown on June 24, 2013. On January 31, 2014, Compass Communications reached a deal to sell KFXP, along with two commonly-owned low-power stations in Beaumont, Texas, to Abraham Telecasting Company, however, the sale fell through. On June 12, 2015, Compass agreed to sell KFXP to Buckalew Media for $450,000. The sale was completed on October 30; on November 9, Buckalew changed the station's call letters to KVUI. Buckalew then announced that it would relaunch KVUI by December 1 as a MeTV affiliate; the station also intends to air some local programming.

Buckalew Media agreed to sell KVUI, along with the construction permit for KVUT-LD in Twin Falls, to Ventura TV Video Appliance Center for $575,000 on January 20, 2017.

Newscasts
Shortly after sign-on, KFXP partnered with KPVI to provide a 9 p.m. newscast on Monday through Friday nights. The program was canceled after a few years and entertainment programming returned to the timeslot. KFXP partnered with KPVI once again in 2006 to produce a late evening newscast at 9 p.m. that debuted on October 30, 2006, entitled KPVI on Fox News at 9; this newscast was also broadcast on Twin Falls sister station KXTF. In preparation for the discontinuance of its Fox affiliation and the switch to This TV, the station canceled the 9 p.m. newscast for a second time, with its last broadcast airing on June 29, 2012; it was replaced with a new weeknight 5:30 p.m. newscast produced by KPVI, that debuted in September 2012. The 5:30 p.m. program was titled KPVI More, an interview and features program that aired simultaneously on KXTF. It contained no weather or sports segments.

Technical information

Subchannels
The station's digital signal is multiplexed:

Analog-to-digital conversion
KVUI (as KFXP) shut down its analog signal, over UHF channel 31, on November 17, 2008. The station "flash-cut" its digital signal into operation UHF channel 31. Because it was granted an original construction permit after the FCC finalized the DTV allotment plan on April 21, 1997, the station did not receive a companion channel for a digital television station.

References

Television channels and stations established in 1998
1998 establishments in Idaho
VUI
Ion Television affiliates
Start TV affiliates
TheGrio affiliates
Cozi TV affiliates
GetTV affiliates
Ion Mystery affiliates
Quest (American TV network) affiliates
Laff (TV network) affiliates
Buzzr affiliates